Anaheim GardenWalk is an outdoor entertainment and shopping center located a block east of the Disneyland Resort in the Anaheim Resort District of Anaheim, California. The center opened on June 14, 2008, during the Great Recession, and has struggled with a low occupancy rate of 55% in 2011. Most of its fashion retailers, including Tommy Bahama, Ann Taylor LOFT, and Hollister Co., have closed prior to 2014. Its most recent casualty was the UltraLuxe Cinemas which closed on August 17, 2015. However, the center has been doing better recently under new ownership and management, but its focus is now more of a center for entertainment rather than a place for shopping. The center features House of Blues Anaheim, Bowlmor, UFCFit, Heat Ultra Lounge, and a multitude of restaurants and shops.

A relocated, expanded House of Blues Anaheim, a major concert venue previously located at the nearby Downtown Disney from 2001 to 2016, opened at GardenWalk in March 2017, following the expiration of its lease with Disney, took over the space formerly occupied by UltraLuxe Cinemas.

Anaheim GardenWalk's has a current directory featuring Bubba Gump Shrimp Co, The Cheesecake Factory, California Pizza Kitchen, Roy's Restaurant, McCormick and Schmick's, Fire + Ice Bar & Grill, Casa de Pancho, AMC, Flightdeck, Meeples Family, Yiya Formosa and Rumba Room Live and more. Its upcoming projects include the opening of Starbucks, Paris Baguette, RAKKEN Ramen, Artist Row, Meet Fresh and Boiling Point. JW Marriott, a 12-story 4 star hotel with 466 guest rooms opened during the Pandemic, adjacent to the property.

Huckleberry Breakfast and Lunch recently opened, and start serving it's patrons from 7AM in the morning at the GardenWalk.

Anaheim GardenWalk has also gained the reputation as a "haven for artists" with its interchanging art murals painted or designed by local artists which allows for exposure on a larger scale.

References

Buildings and structures in Anaheim, California
Tourist attractions in Anaheim, California
Shopping malls in Orange County, California
Shopping malls established in 2008
2008 establishments in California